William John Frederick Vane, 3rd Duke of Cleveland (3 April 1792 – 6 September 1864), styled The Hon. William Vane from 1792 to 1813, The Hon. William Powlett from 1813 to 1827 and Lord William Powlett from 1827 to 1864, was a British politician.

Early life
Vane was the second son of William Vane, 1st Duke of Cleveland and his first wife, Katherine, the second daughter and coheiress of Harry Powlett, 6th Duke of Bolton.

Vane was educated at Brasenose College, Oxford.

Career
He was Member of Parliament for Winchelsea from 1812 to 1815, for County Durham from 1815 to 1831, for St Ives from 1846 to 1852, and for Ludlow from 1852 to 1857. On 3 July 1815 at St James's Church, Piccadilly, he married Lady Grace Caroline Lowther (1792–1883), the fifth daughter of William Lowther, 1st Earl of Lonsdale.

After inheriting the estate of his maternal grandmother, the Dowager Duchess of Bolton in 1809, he changed his surname to Powlett, under the terms of her will, by Royal Licence in 1813. On inheriting the dukedom of Cleveland from his childless brother Henry in 1864, he resumed the surname of Vane.

Personal life
On 3 July 1815, Vane married Lady Grace Caroline Lowther (d. 1883), a daughter of William Lowther, 1st Earl of Lonsdale. Late in life, he lived at Harewood House, at Cheapside, in Berkshire.

Like his elder brother Henry, William also died childless and his titles passed to their younger brother, Harry, who took the name of Powlett shortly after.

References

External links 
 

1792 births
1864 deaths
Powlett, Lord William
Powlett, Lord William
Powlett, William
Powlett, William
Powlett, William
Powlett, Lord William
Powlett, Lord William
Powlett, Lord William
Powlett, Lord William
Powlett, Lord William
Cleveland, D3
Powlett, Lord William
William
Dukes of Cleveland
People from Sunninghill
Barons Barnard